Tesqopa or Tel Skuf, also Tel Eskof or Tall Asqaf is a town in northern Iraq located approximately 19 miles (about 28 kilometres) north of Mosul. The town is populated by Assyrians and they are members of the Chaldean Catholic Church.

The town was captured by ISIS briefly in August 2014 but was recaptured by Kurdish Peshmerga in August 2016. 

Many of the residents of the town returned with aid from the Hungary, while a large portion has migrated to Europe.

Early history
Tesqopa is not mentioned in Thomas of Marga's Book of Governors (c. 840) or any of the other early monastic histories of the Church of the East, and may well have been founded as late as the Seljuq period, perhaps in the eleventh century. It is first mentioned as a Christian village in a thirteenth-century poem by the Assyrian writer Giwargis Warda. This poem describes its sack by a raiding band of Mongols in November 1235 and the destruction of its church of Mar Yaqob the Recluse.

Tesqopa was subject to many attacks by the Mongols, the worst among them was the massacre of 1436 when they attacked the town, killing thousands of its Assyrian inhabitants and burning its crops and churches, ultimately forcing the rest of the inhabitants to flee to the mountains. In 1508 Tesqopa was attacked again by the Mongols, just as they attacked Tel Keppe, Alqosh and the Monastery of Rabban Hormizd. Tesqopa was also attacked by the army of Nader Shah in 1743 during his march on Mosul.

Modern history 
The town received many Assyrian refugees from Baghdad and Mosul in the wake of the sectarian violence in the 2000s. On 23 April 2007 a car bomb that targeted the village resulted in more than 25 deaths.

In early August 2014, Islamic State of Iraq and Syria (ISIS) entered Tesqopa. But on 17 August 2014 the Kurdish Peshmerga retook Tesqopa. After this, the local Christian Assyrians were then able to restore the crosses atop their vandalized churches.  

ISIL militants overran the town during dawn on 3 May 2016 however they were driven out of the town by Peshmerga fighters later in the day.  By 2017, several hundred families had returned to the town and the parish church was functioning again. The Hungarian government assisted in rebuilding the destroyed homes of 991 Christian families.

References

Populated places in Nineveh Governorate
Assyrian communities in Iraq
Nineveh Plains